Ojo Caliente Spring is a hot spring in Lower Geyser Basin, of Yellowstone National Park. It is in the River Group which includes Azure Spring, and is located a few yards off the Fountain Flats Freight Road on the northern bank of the Firehole River.

In Spanish Ojo Caliente means "hot eye".

References

Geothermal features of Yellowstone National Park
Geothermal features of Teton County, Wyoming
Hot springs of Teton County, Wyoming
Hot springs of Wyoming